The Omaha Blues, Jazz, & Gospel Festival is an annual event of blues, jazz and gospel music that has been held at Rosenblatt Stadium in South Omaha and Fort Omaha in North Omaha, Nebraska in August.

Founded by Terry O'Halloran, a local blues bar establishment owner, the festival has included a variety of performers, including Kelley Hunt, Lois "Lady Mac" McMorris, Everette Harp, Preston Love and Lil' Brian and the Zydeco Travelers.

See also 

List of blues festivals 
Culture in Omaha, Nebraska
List of jazz festivals

References

External links
Omaha Blues, Jazz, & Gospel Festival
Omaha Blues Society
 
   

Music venues in Omaha, Nebraska
Jazz festivals in the United States
Blues festivals in the United States
Folk festivals in the United States
Gospel music festivals
Music festivals in Nebraska